Aji Saka (born in  Malang, East Java, 23 February 1991) is an Indonesian former footballer.

Honours

Club 
Arema Indonesia
Indonesia Super League: 2009–10

References

External links
 

Indonesian footballers
Living people
1991 births
People from Malang
Sportspeople from Malang
Sportspeople from East Java
Arema F.C. players
PSS Sleman players
Persepam Madura Utama players
Gresik United players
Persis Solo players
Indonesian Premier League players
Liga 1 (Indonesia) players
Association football goalkeepers
Indonesia youth international footballers
21st-century Indonesian people

id:Aji Saka